Chulmleigh College, previously known as Chulmleigh Community College, is an 11–16 mixed secondary school with academy status in Chulmleigh, Devon, England. It was formerly a community school and converted to an academy on 1 August 2011. It continues to coordinate with Devon County Council for admissions.

Between 2014 and 2018 the whole of the school was rebuilt and refurbished during Mr Johnson's tenure as headmaster. There has been much student speculation around the design of the new main building which has the appearance of the letter "J". Some have claimed this to be a deliberate memorial to Mr Johnson himself, with the "J" representing his surname. This, however, is merely speculation.

Curriculum 
The school offers GCSEs and BTECs courses as programmes of study. Specialising in an academic curriculum, including French amongst its core subjects at GCSE.

Reputation 
The school is rated by Ofsted as "good" and has been rated so since 2010. The school is also ranked as the third best school in Devon with an "above average" rating of 0.43.

Notable alumni 
 Tom Staniford, para-cyclist

References

External links 
 

Secondary schools in Devon
Academies in Devon
Chulmleigh